"No Revolution" is a single by the band The Explosion, released as the second single from their 2004 album Black Tape on August 2, 2005. The song was originally recorded for the band's 2000 album Flash Flash Flash but was rerecorded for Black Tape. The music video features the band playing live. The song reached 107st in the UK single album list. The song has been featured in the soundtracks of the Tony Hawk's Underground in its original Flash Flash Flash version, and NFL Street 2 and Midnight Club 3: DUB Edition in its Black Tape version.

Track listing
"No Revolution"

CD release version
"No Revolution"
"Here I Am" (live)
"Gun"

References

2005 singles
2004 songs
Virgin Records singles